Líctor Hazael Marroquín García (1942/1943 – 7 May 1985) was a Mexican criminal and convicted vehicle thief. He was the best friend of drug kingpin Juan García Abrego, the former leader of the Gulf Cartel, a criminal group based in Tamaulipas, Mexico. In 1978, Marroquín García was indicted by the U.S. District Court of the Southern District of Texas in Brownsville for transporting stolen vehicles from the U.S. into Mexico. He was charged along with seventeen other people, including García Abrego, who was a low-level criminal at that time. Convicted in 1979, Marroquín García had his sentence suspended and was deported back to Mexico. He died of cirrhosis in 1985.

Early life
His parents were Ovidio Marroquín Salinas and Evangelina García de Marroquín. He had two brothers, César Ovidio and Cid Mario. Marroquín García was the best friend of drug kingpin Juan García Abrego, the former leader of the Gulf Cartel, a criminal group based in Tamaulipas, Mexico. Though usually reserved with others, García Abrego was very close to Marroquín García and spoke to him about personal matters. Marroquín García's mother said she remembered García Abrego as a "good boy".

Criminal career
According to an indictment sworn in by a grand jury of the U.S. District Court for the Southern District of Texas in Brownsville on 8 November 1978, sometime between 2 September and 11 October 1978, Marroquín García and seventeen other individuals, including García Abrego, unlawfully transported stolen vehicles from the U.S. into Mexico in violation of a federal code dealing with illegal interstate or foreign commerce. All of these goods were transported to Brownsville, where most were then smuggled and sold in Mexico. The indictment specified that on or around 10 September, Marroquín García met with García Abrego, David Lee Kuehn, Richard Wayne Cotton, and Jesús María González ("Chuy" or "Chema") in Brownsville to coordinate the transfer of a 1977 Kenworth Truck Tractor. The vehicle was stolen by Richard Wayne Cotton, Thomas Scott Bates ("Slick"), and Richard Cook in Houston. Marroquín García drove the tractor from Brownsville to Mexico on or around that date.

On or around 11 October, Cotton, Bates, and Gregory Nathan Fee stole a 1977 Kenworth Truck Tractor and a flat-bed trailer in San Antonio and transported them to Brownsville. The indictment stated that Marroquín García met with García Abrego, González, Fred B. Rendon, Jr., and Saúl Hernández Rivera in Brownsville to discuss arrangements. U.S. authorities stated that Marroquín García and the other co-defendants knew the vehicles were stolen. The tractors were owned by a man identified as Leroy Eash; their loss totaled US$10,000. The U.S. attorneys for the case were J. A. "Tony" Canales and Charles Lewis; the court's clerk was V. Bailey Thomas and the jury foreman was James D. Cook. The investigation was led by the Texas Department of Public Safety with the assistance of local Federal Bureau of Investigation (FBI) officials. When the indictment was issued, García Abrego was a low-level criminal and was not the leader of the Gulf Cartel.

On 13 October, Marroquín García was arrested in Brownsville, along with Rendón and Kuehn. Justice of Peace Alex Perez set a US$5,000 bond for all three individuals. Their defense asked the official to reduce the bond amount to something more "reasonable", but Perez rejected the motion, saying that the bond he requested was recommended by the State of Texas. Following discussions over the bond, Perez discovered that Marroquín García did not understand English, so he proceeded to explain the arrangement in Spanish. On 4 March 1979, Marroquín García was convicted of transporting stolen vehicles using foreign commerce and was sentenced to five years in prison. However, his conviction included an execution of sentence suspended (ESS), which cancelled his sentence as long as he did not violate any conditions set during the term of his probation. He was given five-year's probation without supervision. Marroquín García was deported back to Mexico shortly after the announcement of his conviction.

Death
At 17:00 hours on 7 May 1985, Marroquín García died of cirrhosis in Matamoros. According to details provided by Dr. José Luis Martínez Ortiz, he suffered from esophageal varices and bled from a massive proximal digestive tube. His family held a wake at the Lozano funeral home. He was buried in Jardín cemetery the following day. At the time of his death, Marroquín García was married to Beatriz Martha Hernández Simental. Marroquín García's mother said that García Abrego was deeply saddened by his death and cried "inconsolably" at one of his ranches. García Abrego sent flowers to Marroquín García's grave every year on his death date and on the Day of the Dead until his arrest in 1996. Over the years, García Abrego befriended a man named Luis Medrano García, who later became a high-ranking Gulf Cartel member. Those close to García Abrego said that he became more reserved with others, including people with whom he was also friends, after Marroquín García died.

See also 

 Mexican Drug War

Footnotes

References

Bibliography

1940s births
Gulf Cartel members
1985 deaths
People deported from the United States
People convicted of theft
Deaths from cirrhosis
People from Matamoros, Tamaulipas
Mexican people imprisoned abroad